Chai Nat Bird Park, Chai Nat Zoo or Chai Nat Park is a large bird sanctuary and provincial park in Chai Nat Province, Thailand. It contains over 100 bird species living in simulated surroundings which match the natural habitat of the birds. Also, it has more than 60 cages of birds. The birds can be observed both in their simulated environment and in the cages. The two highlights of the park are the vast bird cage which is the largest aviary in Asia, and a freshwater fish aquarium.

Location 
The zoo & the park is located in Khao Tha Phra Sub-District, Mueng Chainat District, Thailand.

History 
The Chai Nat Bird Park was built in 1983 and first covered an area of 19.76 acres. At present, the park has been developed and extended to be 98 acres. It has become a major attraction and is a source of tourism income for Chai Nat Province.

Features 
The main highlight of the park is the giant aviary that is the largest aviary in Asia. In addition, there are 63 cages of birds contain rare species such as Sarus Cranes, Green Peafowls, Eagles, Falcons, Hawks, and Ravens. Beside the birds, the park also has the Bird Egg Museum that contains many eggs from various species of birds found around the world.
Aside from the aviary part, there are additional interesting sites to visit such as man-made waterfalls, wonderful gardens, a rabbit park, and a zoo. There are several wild animals present in the zoo such as Hog Deer, Elk Deer, and Mountain Goats. The other important highlight of the park is an aquarium which features several types of freshwater fish species found in Chao Phraya River. Lastly, the Space WaterPark is a zone that has a giant waterslide.

References 

Tourist attractions in Chai Nat province
Aviaries